"Smoke Gets in Your Eyes" is a show tune from the musical Roberta.

"Smoke Gets in Your Eyes" may also refer to:

 "Smoke Gets in Your Eyes" (Homicide: Life on the Street), an episode of Homicide: Life on the Street
 "Smoke Gets in Your Eyes" (Mad Men), an episode of Mad Men
 Smoke Gets in Your Eyes: And Other Lessons from the Crematory, memoir by Caitlin Doughty